Sir Francis Lumm, 1st Baronet (1733 − 1796 or 1797) was an Anglo-Irish baronet.

Lumm was the son of Francis Lumm and Sarah Heaton. In 1755 he served as High Sheriff of King's County. In 1762 he was appointed Governor of Ross Castle in County Kerry. On 24 February 1775 he was made a baronet, of Lumville in the Baronetage of Ireland.

He married an heiress, Miss Foster, but died without a male heir, at which point his title became extinct. He was buried at St James's Church, Piccadilly.

References

Year of birth unknown
1797 deaths
18th-century Anglo-Irish people
Baronets in the Baronetage of Ireland
High Sheriffs of King's County